Annon is an English surname. Notable people with this name include:

 Darren Annon, English professional footballer
 William Annon, Ulster Unionist Party and Democratic Unionist Party politician

See also 
 Anno (disambiguation)
 Anon (disambiguation)

English-language surnames